California Molefe (born 12 March 1980) is a Botswana runner who won a silver medal in 400 metres at the 2006 IAAF World Indoor Championships in Moscow, becoming the first Botswana athlete to win a major international medal.

His only title prior to 2006 was a bronze medal at the 1999 African Junior Championships. He competed at the 2004 Olympics, getting knocked out in the heats in the individual contest and placing eighth in the final with the 4 x 400 metres relay team. He won the gold medal in 400 m at the 2007 All-Africa Games.

Molefe set his personal best time during the heats at the 2005 World Championships with 45.34 seconds.

References

External links
 

1980 births
Athletes (track and field) at the 2000 Summer Olympics
Athletes (track and field) at the 2002 Commonwealth Games
Athletes (track and field) at the 2004 Summer Olympics
Athletes (track and field) at the 2006 Commonwealth Games
Athletes (track and field) at the 2008 Summer Olympics
Botswana male sprinters
Living people
Olympic athletes of Botswana
Commonwealth Games competitors for Botswana
African Games gold medalists for Botswana
African Games medalists in athletics (track and field)
Athletes (track and field) at the 2007 All-Africa Games
World Athletics Indoor Championships medalists